General Flores may refer to:

Juan José Flores (1800–1864), Venezuelan general in the patriot army of Simón Bolívar
Manuel González Flores (1833–1893), Mexican Army general of division
Venancio Flores (1808–1868), Uruguayan general in the Cruzada Libertadora
General Flores, a Venezuelan Navy Almirante Clemente-class destroyer

See also
Manuel Antonio Flórez (1723–1799), Spanish Navy captain general